The Robber Bride is a 1916 German silent comedy film directed by Robert Wiene and starring Henny Porten, Friedrich Feher and Artur Menzel. A young woman with romantic ideas rejects the arranged marriage her parents want for her, dreaming instead of marrying a bandit.

Cast
 Henny Porten
 Friedrich Feher
 Artur Menzel
 Karl Elzer

References

Bibliography
 Jung, Uli & Schatzberg, Walter. Beyond Caligari: The Films of Robert Wiene. Berghahn Books, 1999.

External links

1916 films
Films of the German Empire
German silent feature films
German comedy films
Films directed by Robert Wiene
German black-and-white films
1916 comedy films
Silent comedy films
1910s German films